Hoban may refer to:

Barry Hoban (born 1940), British cyclist
Edward Francis Hoban (1878–1966), Catholic bishop of Rockford and Cleveland
James Hoban (1758–1831), Irish-born American architect who designed the White House in Washington, D.C.
James Hoban, Jr. (1808–46), United States Attorney for the District of Columbia and son of the above
Jeanne Hoban (1924–1997), British political activist
Julia Hoban, American writer of children's books
Lillian Hoban (1925–1998), American writer and artist
Mark Hoban (born 1964), British politician
Ovidiu Hoban (born 1982), Romanian footballer
Patricia Hoban (born 1932), Australian basketball player
Russell Hoban (1925–2011), American writer
Walter Hoban (1890-1939) American cartoonist known for Jerry on the Job
Hoban Washburne, fictional character in the television series Firefly
Archbishop Hoban High School, Catholic school in Akron, Ohio

See also 
 Hobița (disambiguation)
 Hoobin (disambiguation)

Romanian-language surnames